Sofia Ceccarello (born 2 December 2002) is an Italian sports shooter. She competed in the women's 10 metre air rifle event at the 2020 Summer Olympics.

References

External links
 

2002 births
Living people
Italian female sport shooters
Olympic shooters of Italy
Shooters at the 2020 Summer Olympics
People from Lugo, Emilia-Romagna
Sportspeople from the Province of Ravenna